is a Japanese retired football player.

National team career
In July 2007, Kawahara was elected Japan U-20 national team for 2007 U-20 World Cup. At this tournament, he played 3 matches. 

After seven seasons with Ehime FC, he retired at the end of 2019 season.

Club statistics
Updated to 1 January 2020.

References

External links
Profile at Ehime FC

1987 births
Living people
Association football people from Saitama Prefecture
Japanese footballers
Japan youth international footballers
J1 League players
J2 League players
Albirex Niigata players
Tochigi SC players
Oita Trinita players
Ehime FC players
Association football forwards